Winder Dam is a proposed small, low-head, earth core rockfill, hydroelectric power generation dam of 0.3 megawatt generation capacity, located across Winder River about 100 km from Karachi in Lasbela District, Balochistan province of Pakistan.

Main objectives
With the construction of the proposed Winder Dam, flood waters of Winder River will be stored. Live storage of the reservoir is 36,167 acre feet of which will be annually available for developing irrigated agriculture. The total command area will be 20,000 acres with a high efficiency irrigation system. This project will produce 300 KW of power generation. Damming the flow of Winder River will save the loss of life and property in the area. Water supply will be for drinking and other domestic uses. Seepage from the dam will recharge the ground water reservoir and increase the ground water resource. Women's emancipation will be served by allotment of government land to landless women of the area.

Other benefits
Damming the flow of Winder River will save the flood water for irrigated agriculture development, power generation and water supply for drinking and other domestic uses. The project will bring general uplift of the people in the area by creation of employment and business opportunities. These indirect benefits, such as employment opportunities and consequent rise in the living standard of the people, socio-economic uplift, poverty reduction and women emancipation however cannot be quantified in monetary term. The direct receipt of the project will be available in shape of irrigation service fee (Abiana) and receipt of cost of sale of energy to consumers. The project would greatly increase the development of fisheries in the area and provide recreation and employment opportunities to the residents of the area.

The estimated cost of the project will be US$148 million, out of which US$177.6 million for civil works and US$0.4 million for electro-mechanical works are required. EIRR of the project is 12.24%.

Features
 Type: earth core rockfill dam (ECRD)
 Height: 31 m (102 ft)
 Length: 517 m (1696 ft)
 Estimated mean annual runoff: 40.365 AF
 Gross storage capacity: 36,484 AF
 Live storage capacity: 36,167 AF
 Life of reservoir: 32 years
 Culturable command area: 10,000 acres
 Cropped area: 20,000 acres
 Cropping intensity: 200%
 Hydropower generation: 300 KW
 Spillway design flood: 150,000 cusecs
 Project cost: Rs. 12,412 million
 EIRR: 12.41%
 B.C. ratio: 1.04:1

Current status
 PC-I amounting to Rs.1.696 billion approved by ECNEC in its meeting held on September 3, 2009.
 The groundbreaking ceremony was graced by the President of Pakistan on January 1, 2010.
 Tenders for construction opened on September 28, 2009 and Letter of Acceptance issued to M/s Techno
Engineering – RSWI JV on February 15, 2010.
 Revised PC-1 amounting to Rs. 12.412 billion cleared by CDWP in its meeting held on June 29, 2010 for
approval of ECNEC.

See also 

 List of dams and reservoirs in Pakistan
 List of power stations in Pakistan
 Khan Khwar Hydropower Project
 Satpara Dam
 Gomal Zam Dam
 Duber Khwar hydropower project

References 

Dams in Balochistan, Pakistan
Hydroelectric power stations in Pakistan
Proposed hydroelectric power stations
Proposed renewable energy power stations in Pakistan